Charles Patrick Greene (born January 23, 1971) is an American former professional baseball catcher. Greene played in Major League Baseball (MLB) with four different teams from 1996 through 2000.

Career
Charlie attended Killian Senior High School in Miami, Florida, from 1986 to 1989.  He was drafted in the 11th round by the Seattle Mariners as a senior, but decided to play for his father, Dr. Charles P. Greene, who coached at Miami-Dade College from 1968 to 1996. In 1990, Greene played collegiate summer baseball with the Wareham Gatemen of the Cape Cod Baseball League.

Greene entered the MLB in 1996 with the New York Mets, playing for them one year before moving to the Baltimore Orioles (1997–98), Milwaukee Brewers (1999) and Toronto Blue Jays (2000). His most productive season came in 1999 with Milwaukee, when he appeared in a career-high 32 games and hit a .173 batting average.

In 55 games, Greene was a .173 hitter (13-for-75) with five runs and two RBI without home runs.

Following his MLB career, Greene has played in Triple-A for the Florida Marlins and Tampa Bay Devil Rays organizations.

Greene currently works for the Milwaukee Brewers as their field coordinator and catching instructor.

In 2009, Greene served as an interim manager of the Triple-A Nashville Sounds for nine games while manager Mike Guerrero was on bereavement leave following the death of his father.

Charlie's younger brother Mick played Division I basketball at the University of South Florida.

References

External links
, or Retrosheet

1971 births
Living people
American expatriate baseball players in Canada
Arizona League Padres players
Baltimore Orioles players
Baseball players at the 1999 Pan American Games
Baseball players from Miami
Binghamton Mets players
Calgary Cannons players
Charleston Rainbows players
Durham Bulls players
Louisville RiverBats players
Major League Baseball catchers
Miami Dade Sharks baseball players
Milwaukee Brewers players
Nashville Sounds managers
New York Mets players
Norfolk Tides players
Pan American Games medalists in baseball
Pan American Games silver medalists for the United States
Portland Beavers players
Richmond Braves players
Rochester Red Wings players
St. Lucie Mets players
Syracuse SkyChiefs players
Tiburones de La Guaira players
American expatriate baseball players in Venezuela
Toronto Blue Jays players
United States national baseball team players
Wareham Gatemen players
Waterloo Diamonds players
Medalists at the 1999 Pan American Games
American expatriate baseball players in Australia
Miami Killian Senior High School alumni